Malotilate (INN) is a drug that has been used in studies for the treatment of liver disease. It has been shown to facilitate liver regeneration in rats.

References

 
 
 

Hepatology
Drugs acting on the gastrointestinal system and metabolism
Medical treatments
Alkene derivatives
Dithioles
Carboxylate esters
Isopropyl esters